The Professorship of the Romance Languages is a statutory chair at the University of Oxford. The first courses in Romance languages were offered by Max Müller in the 1850s and the Selbourne Commission proposed the establishment of a Professorship of Romance or Neo-Latin Languages at Corpus Christi College in the 1870s. The college, however, was unwilling to fund it and so the university had to wait. An appeal for funds and a bequest by Cuthbert Shields allowed the Taylorian Professorship of the Romance Languages to be established in 1909. The first appointee was Hermann Oelsner, who had held the Taylorian lecturership at the university and was an expert in Old French. The "Taylorian" title was eventually dropped and the chair became associated with a fellowship at Trinity College in 1925.

List of Professors of the Romance Languages
 1909–1913: Hermann Oelsner
 1913–1927: Paul Studer
 1927–1930: Edwin George Ross Waters
 1930–1958: Alfred Ewert, FBA
 1958–1968: Thomas Bertram Wallace Reid
 1968–1976: Stephen Ullmann
 1976–1977: Roy Harris
 1978–1996: Rebecca Posner
 1996–present: Martin David Maiden, FBA

References

Further reading 
 Alan Deyermond, A Century of British Medieval Studies, British Academy Centenary Monographs (Oxford: Oxford University Press for the British Academy, 2007).

Professorships at the University of Oxford